Moffat railway station was a station and the terminus of a short branch line which served Moffat, in the Scottish county of Dumfries and Galloway. It was served by trains from the junction at the now closed Beattock.

History 

When the Caledonian Railway was authorised on 31 July 1845, its route was constrained by the difficult terrain of the Southern Uplands, and it followed the Evan Water through Beattock. Moffat was already an important spa town, but the topography prevented it from being directly connected. From 1878 a hydropathic establishment was founded in the town, making use of the thermal springs there.

When the Caledonian Railway declined to build a branch line, local interests considered a railway connection to be advantageous, and promoted a branch line. The Moffat Railway was incorporated on 27 June 1881 with capital of £25,330. The authorised capital needed to be extended (by Act of 19 June 1882) in order to allow an extension to the Caledonian Railway's Beattock station: the original intention was to join the railway some distance north of the station, but the modification resulted in the line running parallel with the Caledonian Railway main line to the Beattock station.

The line opened on 2 April 1883. It was leased to the Caledonian Railway and worked by them. The Moffat Railway was absorbed by the Caledonian by Act of 11 May 1889, with effect from on 11 November 1889.

The line was only 1 mile and 71 chains (3 km) in length, with no intermediate stations; the passenger train journey took between four and six minutes. Kinnear, Moodie and Co. of Edinburgh were the contractors for the station buildings, goods shed, and signal boxes. The station was licensed for the sale of wines and spirits and had a John Menzies bookstall on the platform.

The spa town visitors had at first a service of twelve to fifteen three coach trains per day. In around 1926 this service was replaced by the 'Moffat Bus' or 'Puffer' steam railcar that worked the line until circa 1948. The first train of the day from Beattock was the 6.45am that also took loaded or empty wagons to Moffat as required. The fare in the 1940s was 2d. one way, 3d. return.

The station site
The last passenger train from Moffat was the 3.05pm on 6 December 1954 and the last railtour was on 29 March 1964; the line closed to goods traffic on 6 April 1964. The station and goods shed were demolished and what survives (2004) is an embankment, the abutments of a railway bridge at the southern end of the town, the aptly named 'Station Park', a short section of platform and the station toilets that stood near the platform end.

Stationmasters

Thomas Cowan 1884 - 1891 (formerly station master at Beattock)
Thomas Bryden 1891 - 1895 (formerly station master at Lanark, afterwards station master at Douglas)
Walter Smith 1894 - 1924
William Russell from 1924 (formerly station master at Beattock)
William Hall 1931 - 1933 (afterwards station master at Crieff)
C. Dunbar 1933 - 1944
James Burns from 1944  (formerly station master at Crossmichael)

References

Notes

Sources 
 Butt, R. V. J. (1995). The Directory of Railway Stations: details every public and private passenger station, halt, platform and stopping place, past and present (1st ed.). Sparkford: Patrick Stephens Ltd. . OCLC 60251199.
 Storrar, J. (2010). Moffat Miscellany V.3. A Moffat Bedside Book. Moffat : Jim Storrar. .

External links
Moffat Station

Disused railway stations in Dumfries and Galloway
Railway stations in Great Britain opened in 1883
Railway stations in Great Britain closed in 1954
Former Caledonian Railway stations
Railway lines opened in 1883
Moffat